Furio Nordio was an Italian bobsledder who competed in the early 1960s. He won two gold medals in the four-man event at the FIBT World Championships (1960, 1961).

References
Bobsleigh four-man world championship medalists since 1930

Italian male bobsledders
Possibly living people
Year of birth missing (living people)